Kuaibanshu is a form of oral storytelling performance that is popular in northern China. It is a type of shuochang, somewhat similar to Vietnamese 
vè or rapping.

Background
Kuaiban literally means fast boards. It is also known as kuai shu, literally meaning fast books. In Beijing dialect, the art form is known as kuaibanr. 

The name refers to bamboo clappers, a set of small bamboo boards or bones, which the performer rattles to produce an accompanying beat (similar to rapping). 

The free rhyming style is called "flower point". The line should have seven words. This rule, however, is not strictly followed if the rhythmic beat and rhyme coincide to allow more words or fewer words.

History
While bones have been used as musical instruments in China for thousands of years, kuaiban in its modern form was pioneered by Li Runjie of Tianjin in the 1940s.

Performance
During weekend evenings, groups of middle-aged and elderly people perform kuaiban on the south side of the hill in Jingshan Park in Beijing.

"Kuaiban" is a performance that highly emphasize on “repetition”. In each performance, the rhythm is the same. Bamboo - the material that “kuaiban” made of – has special sacred meaning. In Chinese tradition culture, bamboo symbolizes the elasticity, longevity, happiness and spiritual truth of life. Throughout the ages, bamboo has been praised by many poets and painters. It is not only green in all seasons, but also has a tall and straight line. It is not only a symbol of high wind and bright, a straightforward character, but also a reputation of a gentleman. Bamboo is charming, slender, and long-lasting, symbolizing youth forever. In China, bamboo is a sign of truth and dedication. Bamboo is used as a writing instrument in all parts of the East. For Buddhist and Taoist writers and artists, the straight lines and hollow structure of bamboo have extremely profound symbolic meanings. Bamboo is really something special to Chinese culture.

References

Citations 

Bergeton, Uffe. “Philosophy on Bamboo: Text and the Production of Meaning in Early China by Dirk Meyer.” Philosophy East and West, vol. 65, no. 1, 2015, pp. 352–354., doi:10.1353/pew.2015.0023.
Yuming, Yang, et al. “Bamboo Diversity and Traditional Uses in Yunnan, China.” Mountain Research and Development, vol. 24, no. 2, 2004, pp. 157–165., doi:10.1659/0276-4741(2004)024[0157:bdatui]2.0.co;2.

Sources 
 Hudong.com (in Chinese)
 QYK.com (in Chinese)
 Kuai-ban.com (Chinese)

Chinese storytelling
Chinese culture
Mandarin words and phrases